Pelequén is a Chilean town located in the commune of Malloa, O'Higgins Region. Pelequén is 41 km southwest of the city of Rancagua. The town's economy is based mainly on wine production and handicrafting. Pelequén is famous for the religious festivity in honor of Saint Rose of Lima, whose image is in the Sanctuary of the locality.

See also
 List of towns in Chile

Populated places in Cachapoal Province